Dangerous Crossing or Rail Triangle is a 1937 German crime film directed by Robert A. Stemmle and starring Gustav Fröhlich, Heli Finkenzeller, and Paul Hoffmann. It is set amongst railway workers and takes its name from Gleisdreieck on the Berlin U-Bahn. It was partly shot at the Babelsberg Studios in Potsdam. The film's sets were designed by the art directors  and Erich Czerwonski. It was shot on location around Berlin. It premiered at the city's Ufa-Palast am Zoo.

Synopsis
A young railway worker rescues a woman from committing suicide and swiftly falls in love with her. However before long he is drawn into the criminal schemes of her brother, recently released from prison.

Cast

References

Bibliography

External links 
 

1937 films
Films of Nazi Germany
German crime films
1937 crime films
1930s German-language films
Films directed by Robert A. Stemmle
Films shot in Berlin
Films set in Berlin
UFA GmbH films
German black-and-white films
1930s German films
Films shot at Babelsberg Studios